Wetria is a plant genus of the family Euphorbiaceae, first described as a genus in 1858. It is native to Australia, New Guinea and Southeast Asia.

Species
 Wetria australiensis P.I.Forst. - Papua New Guinea, Queensland 
 Wetria insignis (Steud.) Airy Shaw - Thailand, Myanmar, Peninsular Malaysia, Borneo, Sumatra, Java, Lesser Sunda Islands, Philippines

Formerly included
moved to other genera (Discocleidion, Trigonostemon)
 Wetria cuneifolia - Trigonostemon heteranthus 
 Wetria rufescens - Discocleidion rufescens

References

Acalypheae
Euphorbiaceae genera
Taxa named by Henri Ernest Baillon